The Heterenchelyidae or mud eels are a small family of eels native to the Atlantic, Mediterranean, and eastern Pacific.

Heterenchelyids are bottom-dwelling fish adapted to burrowing into soft mud. Currently, eight species in two genera are recognized in this family.

References

 
Marine fish families
Eels
Ray-finned fish families